Denys Chamay (12 December 1941 – 23 September 2013) was a Swiss fencer. He competed in the team épée event at the 1968 Summer Olympics.

References

External links
 

1941 births
2013 deaths
Swiss male épée fencers
Olympic fencers of Switzerland
Fencers at the 1968 Summer Olympics
Sportspeople from Geneva
Universiade medalists in fencing
Universiade gold medalists for Switzerland
Medalists at the 1967 Summer Universiade